This page documents all tornadoes confirmed by various weather forecast offices of the National Weather Service in the United States in April 2019. Tornado counts are considered preliminary until final publication in the database of the National Centers for Environmental Information.

United States yearly total

April

April 6 event

April 7 event

April 8 event

April 12 event

April 13 event

April 14 event

April 15 event

April 16 event

April 17 event

April 18 event

April 19 event

April 22 event

April 24 event

April 25 event

April 26 event

April 27 event

April 28 event

April 29 event

April 30 event

See also
 Tornadoes of 2019
 List of United States tornadoes from January to March 2019
List of United States tornadoes in May 2019

Notes

References 
	 

2019 natural disasters in the United States
2019-related lists
Tornadoes of 2019
Tornadoes
2019, 1